Henk Visser (5 August 1923 – 11 June 2006) was a Dutch arms and armory collector, philanthropist and Dutch businessman.

The collection is centered around the ivory-stocked pistols. His collection was documented by the curator Jan Piet Puype who discovered that he had all of the very rare and important examples of ivory pistols in his collection (there were only 52 worldwide). The H.L. Visser collection is the largest collection of arms and armory. The Family collection is worth about $150 - $200 million and resides in the Rijksmuseum and the Hermitage Museum.

About Henk Visser
Henk Visser (Hinderikus Lucas Visser) was born in Groningen and became involved in the Dutch resistance during World War II when he was still in High School. He was condemned to death and waited three months on death row before being sent to prison camp in Germany. After the war he went to work for a munitions factory, De Kruithoorn in Den Bosch (Netherlands), and traveled to Russia and Indonesia, where he began his collection of arms and armory. He later became an independent arms dealer, the largest one in the middle east.

Catalogs
 The Visser Collection: Arms of the Netherlands in the Collection of H. L. Visser, Volume I: Catalogue of Firearms, Swords and Related Objects, by Jan Piet Puype, 
 The Visser Collection: Arms of the Netherlands in the Collection of H.L. Visser, Vol. II: Ordnance, by R. Roth, Waanders, Zwolle, 1996,

References 

 Henk Visser (wapenverzamelaar) in the RKD
 Verzetsherdenkingskruis in 1980
 Lecture by Visser on his collection of ivory-stocked pistols for the American Society of Arms Collectors

1923 births
2006 deaths
People from Groningen (city)
Dutch art collectors